Vicente Parra Collado  (5 February 1931 – 2 March 1997) was a Spanish actor.

Early career 
Born in Oliva (Valencia), in a lower-class family, he began his career at a young age in the theater. He formed part of a number of theatrical companies.  Two years later, he reprised the role in the film's sequel ¿Dónde vas, triste de ti? (Where are you going sad man) ? (1960) in which the Mexican actress Marga López, took the role of Queen María Cristina, Archduchess of Austria. Both films, inspired by the "Empress Sissi" trilogy of films (fictional treatments of the life of Empress Elisabeth of Austria), were highly sentimental and typecast him. His popularity declined afterwards.

In the following years Parra starred in the musical Nobleza baturra (Aragonese nobility) (1965) and he mixed his  work in the theater, where he formed his own company, with edgier parts in films like: Varietés (Variety) (1971) under the direction of Juan Antonio Bardem. He left behind his image as a handsome leading man with two horror films for controversial director Eloy de la iglesia: La Semana del Asesino (The Cannibal Man) (1972) and Nadie oyó gritar (Nobody hear the Scream)(1973). In La Semana del asesino, he played  a working class serial killer who put his victims through the grinder at a meat factory.

Later career
After these films, Parra's career never took off again. For a couple of years, he lived and worked in Argentina. Back in Spain, his works were spaced out appearing in brief iconic parts in films like: Las Largas vacaciones del 36 ( The long vacations of 1936) (1976) directed by Jaime Camino; La siesta (The nap) (1976), directed by Jorge Grau; the comedy Nosotros que fuimos tan felices  (We who were so happy) (1976), directed by Antonio Drove and La Guerra de Papá (Dad's war) (1977) (an adaptation of Miguel Delibe's novel El príncipe destronado) under the direction of  Antonio Mercero.

During the first part of the 1980s, Vicente Parra retired for a decade from acting both in films and theater. He came back to the big screen with secondary roles in two films directed by José Luis García Sánchez: Suspiros de españa y Portugal (Sights of Spain and Portugal) (1995), a black comedy, and  Tranvía a la Malvarrosa (Streetcar to the Malvarosa) (1997), which was his last film. He died, age 66, of lung cancer.

Partial filmography

Notes

References 
 Mira, Alberto, Spanish Cinema, The Scarecrow Press, Inc, 2010. 
 Torres, Augusto, Diccionario del cine Español, Espasa Calpe, 1994.

External links

1931 births
1997 deaths
People from Valencia
Spanish male film actors
Spanish male stage actors
20th-century Spanish male actors